The Castle of Arraiolos is a medieval castle in the civil parish of Arraiolos, municipality of Arraiolos, in the Portuguese district of Évora. 

It is classified as a National Monument.

Arraiolos
National monuments in Évora District
Arraiolos